Tungsten(IV) oxide is the chemical compound with the formula WO2.  The bronze-colored solid crystallizes in a monoclinic cell.  The rutile-like structure features distorted octahedral WO6 centers with alternate short W–W bonds (248 pm). Each tungsten center has the d2 configuration, which gives the material a high electrical conductivity.

WO2 is prepared by reduction of WO3 with tungsten powder over the course of 40 hours at 900 °C. An intermediate in this reaction is the partially reduced, mixed valence species W18O49.
2 WO3  +  W  →  3 WO2
The molybdenum analogue MoO2 is prepared similarly.  Single crystals are obtained by chemical transport technique using iodine. Iodine transports the WO2 in the form of the volatile species WO2I2.

References

Tungsten compounds
Transition metal oxides